Fil Kush ( is a mountain of the Hindu Kush in Afghanistan. It is located in Farah Province.

Mountains of the Hindu Kush
One-thousanders of Afghanistan
Landforms of Farah Province